The Puerto Rico national under-20 football team represents Puerto Rico in tournaments at the under-20 level. The team is controlled by the Puerto Rican Football Federation.

History
Puerto Rico made its first appearance on the 1974 CONCACAF Championship, losing all of their matches. They didn't record a win until 1976 against Barbados. It wasn't until 2012 where they had their most successful campaign under coach Jeaustin Campos where they advance through all of the Caribbean qualification and made it to the CONCACAF Championship in Puebla, México.

In 2021, Puerto Rico booked their place on the 2022 CONCACAF U-20 Championship for their second time in history, this time under coach Dave Sarachan after advancing as group leaders defeating Bermuda 6–0 on final matchday.

Tournament results

U–20 CONCACAF Championship 

1974 – First round
1976 – First round
1978 – First round
1980 – Disqualified
1982 – First round
1984 – First round
1986 – 1990 – Did not enter
1993 – Did not qualify
1995 – 2001 – Did not enter
2003 – Did not qualify
2003 – Did not qualify
2005 – Did not enter
2007 – Did not enter
2009 – Did not qualify
2011 – Did not qualify
2013 – First round
2015 – Did not enter
2017 – Did not qualify
2018 – Did not qualify
2020 – Cancelled
2022 – Qualified

Schedule and results
The following is a list of match results in the last 12 months, as well as any future matches that have been scheduled.

Legend

2021

2022

Players

Current squad
 The following players were called up for the 2022 CONCACAF U-20 Championship.
 Match dates: 18 June – 3 July 2022
 Caps and goals correct as of:' 25 June 2022
 Names in italics denote players who have been capped for the senior team.''

See also 

 Puerto Rico national football team

Notes

References

External links
Puerto Rico national Football Team Fan Website 

Caribbean national under-20 association football teams
Football